The Grande River (Uruguay) (Spanish: Arroyo Grande) is a river in Uruguay.

Location

The river forms much of the boundary between the Flores and Soriano Departments.

The main settlement on the river is Ismael Cortinas.

Fluvial system
It is a tributary of the Rio Negro.

The Grande is in the south of Uruguay and  flows northwards for the most part, rising in the range of hills known as the Cuchilla Grande.

References

See also
 Geography of Uruguay

Rivers of Uruguay
Rivers of Flores Department
Rivers of Soriano Department